Harens is a surname. Notable people with the surname include:

Dean Harens (1920–1996), American actor
Thomas Harens (born 1954), American politician

See also
Hargens